Xinxiang Stadium (Simplified Chinese: 新乡体育场) is a multi-purpose stadium in Xinxiang, China.  It is currently used mostly for football matches.  The stadium holds 31,200 people.

Footnotes

Xinxiang
Football venues in China
Sport in Luoyang
Multi-purpose stadiums in China
Sports venues in Henan